Observing Systems is the fourth studio album by German electronic and jazz band Tied & Tickled Trio. It was released on 8 September 2003 by Morr Music.

Track listing

Personnel
Credits are adapted from the album's liner notes.

Tied & Tickled Trio
 Markus Acher – drums, percussion, sampler, turntables
 Micha Acher – electric bass, trumpet, piano, organ, conducting
 Johannes Enders – tenor saxophone, flute, piano
 Andreas Gerth – electronics, processing
 Ulrich Wangenheim – bass clarinet, flute

Additional musicians
 Roberto Di Gioia – piano, organ
 Leo Gmelch – tuba, bass trombone
 Gerhard Gschlößl – trombone
 Robert Klinger – double bass
 Carl Oesterhelt – percussion
 Saam Schlamminger – zarb
 Stefan Schreiber – tenor saxophone, clarinet

Production
 Markus Acher – production, mixing
 Andreas Gerth – production, mixing
 Michael Heilrath – mastering
 Martin Schulze – recording (assistant)
 Mario Thaler – production, mixing, recording

Design
 Jan Kruse – cover artwork
 Gerald von Foris – photography

References

External links
 

2003 albums
Tied & Tickled Trio albums
Morr Music albums